Bradley Beach is a borough in Monmouth County, in the U.S. state of New Jersey. As of the 2020 United States census, the borough's population was 4,282, a decrease of 16 (−0.4%) from the 2010 census count of 4,298, which in turn reflected a decrease of 495 (−10.3%) from the 4,793 counted at the 2000 census. The summer population can reach 30,000.

History
Bradley Beach was named for James A. Bradley, the developer responsible for the creation of the Bradley Beach and Asbury Park. In 1871, William B. Bradner, with James A. Bradley as an investor, acquired  of land north of Avon-by-the-Sea, and south of Ocean Grove. At the time the area where they had purchased their land was known informally as Ocean Park and was part of Ocean Township and later became part of Neptune Township.

Citizens appealed to the New Jersey Legislature for a referendum to separate Bradley Beach from Neptune Township, and on March 13, 1893, Bradley Beach was incorporated, based on the results of a referendum held on March 6, 1893. The borough's incorporation was confirmed on March 13, 1925.

It was the first location in the United States to charge sea bathers for beach access when it began minting its own tin badges starting in 1929.

Sand dunes were constructed on the borough's beaches in the mid-1990s at a cost of $10,000, using snow fences and discarded Christmas trees to build a base of wind-driven sand that rose , atop which dune grass was planted. These dunes helped provide significant protection to Bradley Beach from the havoc wreaked by Hurricane Sandy in October 2012, blunting the impact of the storm surge and limiting damage in the borough to beach areas and homes near the shore to $3 million, while neighboring communities that hadn't constructed such dunes suffered much more extensive damage.

The borough had gone into decline after World War II, with growth returning around 2000 as seasonal visitors and new residents purchased properties, which borough regulations require that they must be renovated on the same footprint as the original home.

Geography

According to the U.S. Census Bureau, the borough had a total area of 0.63 square miles (1.64 km2), including 0.61 square miles (1.58 km2) of land and 0.02 square miles (0.05 km2) of water (3.33%).

The borough borders the Monmouth County municipalities of Avon-by-the-Sea, Neptune City and Neptune Township.

Demographics

2010 census

The Census Bureau's 2006–2010 American Community Survey showed that (in 2010 inflation-adjusted dollars) median household income was $59,792 (with a margin of error of +/− $10,658) and the median family income was $75,575 (+/− $7,930). Males had a median income of $51,250 (+/− $12,410) versus $39,902 (+/− $12,133) for females. The per capita income for the borough was $35,446 (+/− $4,420). About 2.5% of families and 14.1% of the population were below the poverty line, including 5.7% of those under age 18 and 2.9% of those age 65 or over.

2000 census
As of the 2000 United States census there were 4,793 people, 2,297 households, and 1,086 families residing in the borough. The population density was 8,097.6 people per square mile (3,136.6/km2). There were 3,132 housing units at an average density of 5,291.4 per square mile (2,049.6/km2). The racial makeup of the borough was 88.15% White, 3.86% African American, 0.17% Native American, 1.46% Asian, 0.02% Pacific Islander, 4.01% from other races, and 2.34% from two or more races. Hispanic or Latino of any race were 12.83% of the population.

There were 2,297 households, out of which 18.3% had children under the age of 18 living with them, 32.4% were married couples living together, 10.2% had a female householder with no husband present, and 52.7% were non-families. 42.5% of all households were made up of individuals, and 8.3% had someone living alone who was 65 years of age or older. The average household size was 2.09 and the average family size was 2.91.

In the borough the population was spread out, with 18.0% under the age of 18, 8.0% from 18 to 24, 38.6% from 25 to 44, 23.1% from 45 to 64, and 12.3% who were 65 years of age or older. The median age was 37 years. For every 100 females, there were 99.0 males. For every 100 females age 18 and over, there were 98.3 males.

The median income for a household in the borough was $40,878, and the median income for a family was $49,688. Males had a median income of $37,164 versus $31,276 for females. The per capita income for the borough was $25,438. About 5.7% of families and 9.2% of the population were below the poverty line, including 14.9% of those under age 18 and 6.3% of those age 65 or over.

Government

Local government
Bradley Beach has been governed within the Faulkner Act system of New Jersey municipal government under the Small Municipality plan 5, as implemented on July 1, 1992, based on the recommendations of a Charter Study Commission. The borough is one of 18 municipalities (of the 564) statewide that use this form of government, which is only available to municipalities with a population less than 12,000 at the time of adoption. The governing body is comprised of the Mayor and the four-member Borough Council, whose members are elected at-large in nonpartisan elections. The Mayor is elected to a four-year term of office and the four council members are chosen to serve three-year terms on a concurrent basis. As of 2010, the borough's nonpartisan elections were shifted from May to the November general election as part of an effort to reduce costs and increase voter participation. The borough had previously operated under the Walsh Act form of New Jersey municipal government starting in 1915, and used a five-member commission, with one member selected to serve as Mayor.

, the Mayor of Bradley Beach is Larry C. Fox, whose term of office ends on December 31, 2024. Members of the Borough Council are Council President Alan Gubitosi, Randolph Bonnell, Timothy Sexsmith and John Weber, all serving concurrent terms ending December 31, 2022.

Federal, state, and county representation
Bradley Beach is located in the 6th Congressional District and is part of New Jersey's 30th state legislative district. 

 

Monmouth County is governed by a Board of County Commissioners comprised of five members who are elected at-large to serve three year terms of office on a staggered basis, with either one or two seats up for election each year as part of the November general election. At an annual reorganization meeting held in the beginning of January, the board selects one of its members to serve as Director and another as Deputy Director. , Monmouth County's Commissioners are
Commissioner Director Thomas A. Arnone (R, Neptune City, term as commissioner and as director ends December 31, 2022), 
Commissioner Deputy Director Susan M. Kiley (R, Hazlet Township, term as commissioner ends December 31, 2024; term as deputy commissioner director ends 2022),
Lillian G. Burry (R, Colts Neck Township, 2023),
Nick DiRocco (R, Wall Township, 2022), and 
Ross F. Licitra (R, Marlboro Township, 2023). 
Constitutional officers elected on a countywide basis are
County clerk Christine Giordano Hanlon (R, 2025; Ocean Township), 
Sheriff Shaun Golden (R, 2022; Howell Township) and 
Surrogate Rosemarie D. Peters (R, 2026; Middletown Township).

Politics
As of March 2011, there were a total of 2,514 registered voters in Bradley Beach, of which 763 (30.4%) were registered as Democrats, 468 (18.6%) were registered as Republicans and 1,279 (50.9%) were registered as Unaffiliated. There were 4 voters registered as Libertarians or Greens.

In the 2012 presidential election, Democrat Barack Obama received 55.9% of the vote (1,026 cast), ahead of Republican Mitt Romney with 42.7% (783 votes), and other candidates with 1.4% (25 votes), among the 1,856 ballots cast by the borough's 2,681 registered voters (22 ballots were spoiled), for a turnout of 69.2%. In the 2008 presidential election, Democrat Barack Obama received 56.2% of the vote (1,152 cast), ahead of Republican John McCain with 39.7% (814 votes) and other candidates with 2.1% (43 votes), among the 2,050 ballots cast by the borough's 2,803 registered voters, for a turnout of 73.1%. In the 2004 presidential election, Democrat John Kerry received 54.5% of the vote (1,133 ballots cast), outpolling Republican George W. Bush with 43.9% (912 votes) and other candidates with 0.8% (24 votes), among the 2,078 ballots cast by the borough's 2,964 registered voters, for a turnout percentage of 70.1.

In the 2013 gubernatorial election, Republican Chris Christie received 63.9% of the vote (784 cast), ahead of Democrat Barbara Buono with 34.5% (423 votes), and other candidates with 1.6% (20 votes), among the 1,240 ballots cast by the borough's 2,721 registered voters (13 ballots were spoiled), for a turnout of 45.6%. In the 2009 gubernatorial election, Republican Chris Christie received 51.8% of the vote (667 ballots cast), ahead of  Democrat Jon Corzine with 40.0% (515 votes), Independent Chris Daggett with 6.8% (87 votes) and other candidates with 1.0% (13 votes), among the 1,287 ballots cast by the borough's 2,641 registered voters, yielding a 48.7% turnout.

Education
The Bradley Beach School District serves public school students in pre-kindergarten through eighth grade at Bradley Beach Elementary School. As of the 2020–21 school year, the district, comprised of one school, had an enrollment of 263 students and 37.8 classroom teachers (on an FTE basis), for a student–teacher ratio of 7.0:1.

For public school students in ninth through twelfth grades, the school district maintains sending/receiving relationships with the Asbury Park Public Schools and Neptune Township Schools under which 93% of Bradley Beach students are sent to Asbury Park High School and the other 7% are sent to Neptune High School. As of the 2020–21 school year, Asbury Park High school had an enrollment of 682 students and 54.5 classroom teachers (on an FTE basis), for a student–teacher ratio of 12.5:1 and Neptune High School had an enrollment of 1,270 students and 115.0 classroom teachers (on an FTE basis), for a student–teacher ratio of 11.0:1.

An application program with Red Bank Regional High School or the schools in the Monmouth County Vocational School District are alternatives available for students from the borough attending public high school.

Public school students also have the option to attend Academy Charter High School in Lake Como, which accepts students on a lottery basis from the communities of Allenhurst, Asbury Park, Avon-by-the-Sea, Belmar, Bradley Beach, Deal, Interlaken and Lake Como.

Public high school students may also apply to attend one of the magnet schools in the Monmouth County Vocational School District—Marine Academy of Science and Technology, Academy of Allied Health & Science, High Technology High School, Biotechnology High School, and Communications High School.

The Bradley Beach Public Library is located at 511 Fourth Avenue, on the corner of Fourth Avenue and Hammond Avenue. In early 2017, a building expansion was added to the south elevation of the circa 1927 built library building. The structural design was performed by the Structural Engineering department of French Parrello Associates (FPA). There are many activities at the library for people of all ages including various story times, a writing group and weekly Overeaters Anonymous meetings. In the spring of 2014 the library introduced a book bike which a librarian or volunteer rides around town and on the boardwalk to give books and to tell residents about the opportunities and activities coming up at the library and around the borough.

Transportation

Roads and highways

Route 71 (Main Street) is the main road that runs through the town. Route 18 is in neighboring Neptune Township, and both the Garden State Parkway and Interstate 195 are within a 10 to 15 minute drive.

Public transportation
NJ Transit provides rail service at the Bradley Beach station connecting the borough to Hoboken Terminal, Newark Penn Station, Secaucus Junction and New York Penn Station on the North Jersey Coast Line.

NJ Transit bus service is available between the borough and Philadelphia on the 317 route, with local service offered on the 830 route.

Climate

According to the Köppen climate classification system, Bradley Beach has a humid subtropical climate (Cfa). Cfa climates are characterized by all months having an average temperature above , at least four months with an average temperature greater than or equal , at least one month with an average temperature greater than or equal  and no significant precipitation difference between seasons. The average wettest month is July which correlates with the peak in thunderstorm activity. Episodes of extreme cold and wind can occur with wind chill values below .

Ecology

According to the A. W. Kuchler U.S. potential natural vegetation types, Bradley Beach would have a dominant vegetation type of Appalachian Oak (104) with a dominant vegetation form of Eastern Hardwood Forest (25). The average date of first spring leaf-out is March 24 and fall color typically peaks in early-November.

Chess 
In 1929, Bradley Beach hosted an international chess tournament at Hotel La Reine. Alexander Alekhine, the reigning world chess champion at the time, won the tournament with an impression score of 8.5/9.

Notable people

People who were born in, residents of, or otherwise closely associated with Bradley Beach include:

 James A. Bradley (1830–1921), New Jersey State Senator, philanthropist and real estate developer, who developed Asbury Park and was the namesake of Bradley Beach
 TJ Lubinsky (born 1972), radio host
 James D. Melville Jr. (born 1957), diplomat who served as the United States Ambassador to Estonia
 Jeannette Mirsky (1903–1987), author who was awarded a Guggenheim Fellowship in 1947 for her biographical writings on the history of exploration
 Pat Pacillo (born 1963), former Major League Baseball player who pitched for the Cincinnati Reds in 1987 and 1988
 Christine Quinn (born 1966), Speaker of the New York City Council
 Cesar Romero (1907–1994), actor
 Philip Roth (born 1933), author of Goodbye, Columbus and Portnoy's Complaint
 Isaac Schlossbach (1891–1984), polar explorer, submariner and aviation pioneer
 Bruce Springsteen (born 1949), musician
 Thomas Vezzetti (1928–1988), 33rd Mayor of Hoboken, New Jersey
 Tommy West (1942–2021, born as Thomas Picardo), singer-songwriter and record producer
 Murray A. Wiener (born 1909), polar explorer

References

External links

 Bradley Beach website
 Bradley Beach Elementary School
 
 School Data for the Bradley Beach Elementary School, National Center for Education Statistics

 
1893 establishments in New Jersey
Boroughs in Monmouth County, New Jersey
Faulkner Act (small municipality)
Jersey Shore communities in Monmouth County
Populated places established in 1893